Aerenicopsis is a genus of beetles in the family Cerambycidae, containing the following species:

 Aerenicopsis angaibara Martins & Galileo, 2004
 Aerenicopsis championi Bates, 1885
 Aerenicopsis hubrichi Bruch, 1925
 Aerenicopsis irumuara Martins & Galileo, 2004
 Aerenicopsis malleri Lane, 1966
 Aerenicopsis megacephala (Breuning, 1940)
 Aerenicopsis mendosa Martins & Galileo, 1998
 Aerenicopsis perforata Lane, 1939
 Aerenicopsis pugnatrix (Lane, 1966)
 Aerenicopsis rejanae Galileo & Martins, 2007
 Aerenicopsis rufoantennata (Breuning, 1974)
 Aerenicopsis singularis Martins & Galileo, 1998
 Aerenicopsis sublesta Lane, 1966
 Aerenicopsis virgata (Pascoe, 1878)

References

Aerenicini